Eugene Byrd (born August 28, 1975) is an American actor. He is best known for playing Wink in the film 8 Mile and Dr. Clark Edison on the FOX series Bones.

Early life
Byrd was born in Philadelphia, Pennsylvania. He graduated from Greene Street Friends School in 1989 and The Crefeld School in 1993.

Career
Byrd began acting as a child, appearing as Arthur in the film My Little Girl in 1986. His subsequent film appearances include Dead Man, Demon Island, Sleepers, 8 Mile, Lift and Anacondas: The Hunt for the Blood Orchid. He had the lead role in Confess, for which he won the Break-Out Performance Award at the 2006 Method Fest Independent Film Festival. He also collaborated with longtime friends Will Fuller, Jerry Della Salla and Clay Von Thomas for a film titled The Barracks.

Byrd had a guest spot on the Nickelodeon series Are You Afraid of the Dark?, playing a teenage prankster named Weeds in the episode "The Tale of the Super Specs." He has also made appearances on The Cosby Show, Beverly Hills, 90210 as Robinson Ashe III, Touched by an Angel and its spinoff Promised Land as Lawrence "L.T." Taggert, a troubled teen struggling with gang related drug and violence issues. He starred in the Disney film Perfect Harmony, which explores the racial tensions between African-American and white populations in South Carolina. His character, Landy Allen, is the grandson of an African-American caretaker at an all-white private academy. His character's musical talent attracts the interest of a student named Taylor Bradshaw (played by Justin Whalin), who sets out to explore the music and lives of African-American residents, knowing his actions could result in expulsion from the academy and rejection by his fellow white students and friends.

In 1993, Byrd appeared as Walter Haines on Ghostwriter. He portrayed the comical but defiant Oliver Cross on Chris Cross, which won an award for "Best Children's Series" in 1994. The series aired on the Showtime from 1994 to 1995. He guest starred on NYPD Blue, had a minor role on Heroes and a recurring role as Sidney on Crossing Jordan, which aired on NBC from 2001 to 2007. He has also made appearances on Two and a Half Men and the Syfy series Eureka as Dr. Michael Clark in the episode "Worst Case Scenario."  He played a detective on American Horror Story: Asylum.

Byrd had a recurring role as Dr. Clark Edison on Bones. Starting with season eight, his character is hired as a full-time staff forensic anthropologist by Jeffersonian Forensic Division head Dr. Camille Saroyan (played by Tamara Taylor). He was credited as a guest star during his tenure on the show. He also played Andy Diggle on The CW series Arrow.

In 2014, he was hired by video game company Electronic Arts to play Marcus "Boomer" Boone in Battlefield Hardline.

He voiced Delmont "Del" Walker in Gears of War 4 and Zander Freemaker on Lego Star Wars: The Freemaker Adventures in 2016 and 2017.

Personal life

Legal troubles
On January 6, 2011, The Glendale News reported that Byrd was arrested in California by the Glendale Police Department for suspicion of domestic assault on January 1, 2011. The disposition of this case has not been made public.

Filmography

Film

Television

Video games

References

External links

Living people
African-American male actors
20th-century American male actors
21st-century American male actors
American male child actors
Place of birth missing (living people)
American male film actors
American male television actors
20th-century African-American people
21st-century African-American people
1975 births